Peter of Bulgaria may refer to:
Peter I of Bulgaria
Peter Delyan, sometimes referred to as Peter II
Constantine Bodin, sometimes referred to as Peter III
Peter IV of Bulgaria, sometimes referred to as Peter II